Julius Erich Wess (5 December 19348 August 2007) was an Austrian theoretical physicist noted as the co-inventor of the Wess–Zumino model and Wess–Zumino–Witten model in the field of supersymmetry and conformal field theory.  He was also a recipient of the Max Planck medal, the Wigner medal, the Gottfried Wilhelm Leibniz Prize, the Heineman Prize, and of several honorary doctorates.

Life and work 

Wess was born in Oberwölz Stadt, a small town in the Austrian state of Styria.  He received his Ph.D. in Vienna, where he was a student of Hans Thirring.  His Ph.D. examiner was acclaimed quantum mechanics physicist Erwin Schrödinger. After working at CERN in Switzerland and at the Courant Institute of New York University, United States, he became a professor at the University of Karlsruhe. In later life, Wess was professor at the Ludwig Maximilian University of Munich. After his retirement he worked at DESY in Hamburg.

His doctoral students include Hermann Nicolai.

Julius Wess died at the age of 72 in Hamburg, following a stroke.

Publications
 
 
Scientific articles authored by Julius Wess recorded in INSPIRE-HEP.

References

Further reading
 Julius Wess Nachruf
 Die Fakultät für Physik trauert um ihren Kollegen Prof. Dr. Julius Wess 
 Wess Nachruf HU Berlin

1934 births
2007 deaths
People from Murau District
20th-century Austrian physicists
20th-century German physicists
Gottfried Wilhelm Leibniz Prize winners
Members of the Austrian Academy of Sciences
Members of the European Academy of Sciences and Arts
Winners of the Max Planck Medal
People associated with CERN